State Route 188 (SR 188) is a  north–south state highway in West Tennessee, connecting the towns of Maury City and Alamo with Yorkville via Crockett Mills and Eaton.

Route description

SR 188 begins in Crockett County at an intersection with SR 54 and SR 88, approximately halfway between the towns of Maury City and Alamo. It heads north through farmland and rural areas to an interchange with US 412 (SR 20) and an intersection with SR 152 in Cairo before passing through Crockett Mills. Shortly afterwards, the highway crosses the Middle Fork of the Forked Deer River into Gibson County. SR 188 then passes through Eaton, where it has an intersection with SR 104. It continues north to cross the North Fork of the Forked Deer River and pass through rural areas before entering Yorkville, where SR 188 comes to an end at an intersection with SR 77. The entire route of SR 188 is a two-lane highway.

Major intersections

References

188
Transportation in Crockett County, Tennessee
Transportation in Gibson County, Tennessee